The Cymric Oil Field is a large oil field in Kern County, California, in the United States. While only the 14th-largest oil field in California in total size, in terms of total remaining reserves it ranks fifth, with the equivalent of over  still in the ground. Production at Cymric has been increasing faster than at any other California oil field.

Setting
The Cymric field is in the Temblor Valley, along the west side of State Route 33, between that highway and the Temblor Range. It is north of the town of McKittrick, which is at the junction of State Route 58 and 33.

Adjacent to the Cymric Field on the south are the smaller fields of McKittrick, Belgian Anticline and Railroad Gap, and on the east, along Route 33, is the small Monument Junction field.

The local climate is arid to semi-arid, and the predominant native groundcover is grassland and low scrub. In many areas of active oil field development, almost all vegetation has been removed.

Geology
Most of the oil in the Cymric field is in a sandstone formation known as the Tulare, which is divided into three units: the Tulare I, II, and Amnicola. All are of Pleistocene age. The Tulare formation was created mainly in a braided stream and fan delta depositional environment, while the depositional characteristics of the Amnicola suggest a lacustrine (lake) environment, as well as braided stream. These kinds of rocks have high porosity (around 35%) but low permeability, allowing considerable oil to accumulate in the formation, while a combination of structural and stratigraphic traps keep the oil from migrating further upward. Throughout the history of the field, these upper units have been the most productive, and they were also the first to be discovered, in 1909.

Other productive units include the Etchegoin, of Pliocene age (this same unit is productive in many oil fields in the southwestern San Joaquin Valley); the Reef Ridge Formation, of Miocene age; the McDonald/Devilwater pool in the Monterey Formation, of Miocene age; the Agua (Santos) pool in the Temblor formation, of Oligocene age; and the Kreyenhagen Formation, of Eocene age. One of the most productive pools of all, the Carneros pool in the Temblor Formation, was not discovered until 1946, but it reached its peak production just one year later, with over  produced during that year from that pool alone.

Many of the pools, especially in the deeper units, were not found until the 1940s to the 1980s.

History and production

The Nacirema Oil Company discovered the Cymric field in 1909, when they drilled into the huge Tulare pool with their Well No. 1. In 2006, the most recent year for which data was available, it had the fastest-growing production of any field in California.

Oil produced at Cymric is predominantly heavy crude, with specific gravity around 11-15 API. Since it flows poorly, being highly viscous, much of the field is steamflooded. This combination of water and heat assists the movement of petroleum towards production wells. Production wells on the Cymric field are often closely spaced, with some parts of the oil field having wells at  spacing (5/8 acre).

Currently, the principal operators on the field are Chevron Corp., Aera Energy LLC, and Plains Exploration and Production (PXP), which acquired former operator Nuevo Energy in 2004.

References
 California Oil and Gas Fields, Volumes I, II and III. Vol. I (1998), Vol. II (1992), Vol. III (1982). California Department of Conservation, Division of Oil, Gas, and Geothermal Resources (DOGGR). 1,472 pp. Cymric information pp. 110–124. PDF file available on CD from www.consrv.ca.gov.
 California Department of Conservation, Oil and Gas Statistics, Annual Report, December 31, 2006.

Notes

External links
San Joaquin Geological Society:  Oil history in Kern County

Oil fields in Kern County, California
Natural gas fields in the United States
Geography of the San Joaquin Valley
Temblor Range